Muisne Canton is a canton of Ecuador, located in the Esmeraldas Province.  Its capital is the town of Muisne.  Its population at the 2001 census was 25,080.

References

Cantons of Esmeraldas Province